Muteness is a speech disorder in which a person lacks the ability to speak.

Mute or the Mute may also refer to:

Arts and entertainment

Film and television
 Mute (2005 film), a short film by Melissa Joan Hart
 Mute (2018 film), a science-fiction thriller directed by Duncan Jones
 "Mute" (The Twilight Zone), a 1963 episode of The Twilight Zone
 Mutes, anthropomorphic animals in the American animated television series Kipo and the Age of Wonderbeasts

Music
 Mute (music), a device used to alter the sound of a musical instrument
 Left-hand muting or palm mute, guitar muting techniques
 Mute Records, a record label in the United Kingdom
 Mute (album), a 2000 indie rock compilation album from Hush Records
 Muted (album), a 2003 album from hip hop artist Alias

In print
 Mute (novel), a 1981 novel by Piers Anthony
 "Mute" (short story), by Stephen King
 Mute, a character in Tom Clancy's Rainbow Six Siege
 Mute (magazine), an online magazine of culture and politics

People
 Múte Bourup Egede (born 1987), Prime Minister of Greenland
 Shō Gen (1528–1572), king of the Ryukyu Kingdom called Gen the mute
 Pârvu Mutu (1657–1735), Wallachian Romanian muralist and church painter nicknamed Pârvu the Mute

Other uses
 Mute (death customs), a professional mourner in Victorian and other European cultures
 Mute (food), a soup from Colombia
 Mute Island, part of the Society Islands of French Polynesia
 A silent letter, in phonology

See also
 Carlos Gardel (1890–1935), French-born Argentine singer, songwriter, composer and actor known ironically as "El Mudo" ("The Mute")
 Juan Fernández Navarrete (1526–1579), Spanish Mannerist painter called "El Mudo"